Mianeh (also Romanized as Meyāneh, Miane, Miyāna, Meyaneh, and Mīyaneh) is a city in the Central District of Mianeh County, East Azerbaijan province, Iran, and serves as capital of the county. It is the fourth most populous city in East Azerbaijan province.

At the 2006 census, its population was 87,385 in 22,728 households. The following census in 2011 counted 95,505 people in 26,549 households. The latest census in 2016 showed a population of 98,973 people in 30,504 households.

The city was strategically located, during antiquity was a frontier city for a key travel route between Iraq and Azerbaijan.

Historical monuments in the city of Mianeh include the Imamzadeh Esmail Mausoleum (Kamaləddin). Nearby monuments include Kiz Castle (also known as Qız Qalası), the Stone Tark Mosque, and the Kiz Bridge (Qız Körpüsü). The Kiz Bridge was partly destroyed in December 1946 by Communist militants of the Azerbaijani Democratic Party advocating for independence to halt the offensive of the Capitalist-supported Imperial Iranian Army.

Mianeh is a touristic city, with roads connecting all of Iran. It is an important manufacturer of steel. It has an important railway serving both industrial needs (for the steel industry) and passenger transportation needs to mainly Tehran, Tabriz, Zanjan, Maragheh, and Karaj. Currently, a lot of Baroque-style construction work is happening in the housing sector, modernizing the city. It has a historical Bazaar where mainly textile sellers, clothing sellers, carpet sellers, and gold sellers are present. Since 2020, a vibrant Sangfarsh (Stone Carpet) has been built in the Bazaar district, where small shops can be found with natural products from across the region and country, amongst others.

Notable people

Among notable people from Mianeh are:
Afsar Asadi, actress
Aref Arefkia, singer
Dariush Eghbali, singer
Yossef Karami, Olympic medalist
Behnam Mahmoudi, volleyball player
Rizali Khajavi, Selfless Farmer
Shahram Mahmoudi, volleyball player
Jafar Panahi, director of the movies The Circle, The White Balloon and Crimson Gold
, political activist, former Tabriz police chief
Maryam Sadeghi, computer scientist in the field of medical image analysis

See also 
 East Azerbaijan
 Tabriz

References 

Meyaneh County

Cities in East Azerbaijan Province

Populated places in East Azerbaijan Province

Populated places in Meyaneh County